Laurence Augustine "Gus" Dobrigh (11 February 1893 – 21 September 1982) was an Australian rules footballer who played with Collingwood in the Victorian Football League (VFL).

A half forward flanker in Collingwood's 1917 premiership team, Dobrigh was also a three time losing Grand Finalist. He was suspended by his club in 1919 over a payment dispute, but there were incorrect rumours at the time that it was because he had been suspected of playing dead in a game. After finishing with Collingwood at the end of 1921, Dobrigh moved to Port Melbourne in the Victorian Football Association (VFA), where he captained the club to a premiership in 1922; he was again caught up in a bribery scandal, being offered and turning down a significant sum of money by former  player Vern Banbury to play dead in the Grand Final. He was playing coach at Northcote in 1925, then with Preston, for the club's inaugural VFA season in 1926. He would later return to Port Melbourne once his playing days were over, as coach.

References

External links

1893 births
Australian rules footballers from Victoria (Australia)
Collingwood Football Club players
Collingwood Football Club Premiership players
Preston Football Club (VFA) players
Preston Football Club (VFA) coaches
Port Melbourne Football Club players
Port Melbourne Football Club coaches
Northcote Football Club players
Northcote Football Club coaches
1982 deaths
One-time VFL/AFL Premiership players